Habaraduwa is a small town in the Galle District, Southern Province, Sri Lanka.

See also
 Habaraduwa railway station
List of towns in Southern Province, Sri Lanka

References

External links

Populated places in Southern Province, Sri Lanka
Seaside resorts in Sri Lanka